Catholic Renewal describes changes in the Roman Catholic Church in the 20th century, which can be classified in three major areas: (1) the approach towards the Bible (from Latin Vulgate to comprehensive translations of critical editions of texts in original languages), (2) liturgical practices (from the liturgy in Latin to Mass in the contemporary language with the active engagement of lay faithful) and (3) the role of faith in Christian life (from an at times very formal and legal approach towards the church to emphasis on the catechumenate and acknowledging individual need for the experience of Divinity).

Biblical renewal started with Pope Pius XII's 1943 encyclical Divino afflante Spiritu after which Catholic translations of the Bible became based directly on the texts found in manuscripts in the original languages. Later documents (of which Dogmatic Constitution on Divine Revelation published as a result of the Second Vatican Council can be considered to be of special importance) were encouraged to provide versions of the Bible in the "mother tongues" of the faithful, and urged both clergy and laity to continue to make Bible study a central part of their lives.

Liturgical renewal was launched by the Second Vatican Council, emphasising that "the faithful should be led to that fully conscious and active participation in liturgical celebrations which is demanded by the very nature of the liturgy" (Constitution on the Sacred Liturgy).

Other Second Vatican Council documents, like the Dogmatic Constitution on the Church, can be considered to be the background for catechumenate renewal which was introduced in many Catholic particular churches in many forms soon after the Council (of which the Neocatechumenate is probably the best known), and for charismatic renewal which started in 1967.

See also
Church renewal

20th-century Catholicism